This is a list of Arab Americans and Middle Eastern Americans in the U.S. Congress. This list would include North Africans in the United States who identify as Arab as well as non-Arab Middle Eastern Americans.

The first Arab American to serve in the U.S. House of Representatives was George A. Kasem in 1959, and the first Arab-American U.S. senator was James Abourezk in 1973.  In the 115th Congress, there were six U.S. representatives and no U.S. senators of Arab-American descent serving in Congress.  On November 6, 2018, four additional Arab Americans, all of whom are female, were elected to the U.S. House of Representatives: Debbie Mucarsel-Powell, Ilhan Omar, Donna Shalala and Rashida Tlaib. Tlaib and Omar were also the first Muslim women in Congress. The U.S. House of Representatives currently has five Arab-American members.

The first Assyrian American to serve in the U.S. House of Representatives was Adam Benjamin in 1977, and the first Iranian-American U.S. Representative was Stephanie Bice in 2021. There currently is one Assyrian-American and one Iranian-American U.S. Representative serving in Congress.

Senate

House of Representatives

References 
Notes

References

Congress
Lists of American politicians
Lists of American people by ethnic or national origin
Lists of members of the United States Congress